Alex Warnick (born September 1988) is an American naturalist, and painter.

Warnick grew up in Indiana and began painting and studying birds at young age. She explains, "Birds have always been my mild obsession. In 5th grade, I delivered my career project on ornithology sitting in a giant nest I’d built from willow sticks. I held a pair of binoculars in my sixth grade yearbook picture." She graduated from Brigham Young University-Idaho with a degree in integrated studio art and an emphasis in scientific illustration.

Career
Warnick's paintings have been highlighted in numerous art shows, exhibits, and art websites. Her work has been featured in numerous articles and blogs including a profile from the magazine Audubon that chronicled her work, "The Indiana-based artist (who was born in the same town as Roger Tory Peterson) melds vintage styles drawn from Mark Catesby and Jacques Barraband with modern precision, crafting each project around hours of sketching outdoors.".

In 2016, Warnick was awarded the Donald and Virginia Eckelberry Endowment from the Academy of Natural Sciences of Drexel University for a six-month trip to the island of Hispaniola to illustrate 31 endemic bird species. A collection of paintings from the trip were published by INICIA in the book Alas & Colores.

Personal life
Warnick has an identical twin sister, Shae Warnick, who is also a painter and ornithologist. She is a member of the Church of Jesus Christ of Latter-day Saints (LDS Church) and served an LDS Church mission to the Philippines.

References

External links
Alex Warnick: Official website
Alas & Colores: Interactive website

1988 births
Living people
21st-century American women artists
21st-century American painters
American women painters
Latter Day Saint artists
American Latter Day Saint artists